Arthur Whitney may refer to:

Arthur Whitney (computer scientist), American computer scientist, developer of the K programming language
Arthur Whitney (politician) (1871-1942), Republican nominee for Governor of New Jersey in 1925